Front line refers to the forward-most forces on a battlefield.

Front line, front lines or variants may also refer to:

Books and publications
 Front Lines (novel), young adult historical novel by American author Michael Grant
 Frontlines series, a novel series by Marko Kloos
 Frontline (journal), journal produced in support of the Scottish Socialist Party
 Frontline (magazine), English-language Indian news magazine
 Frontline Combat, 1950s war comic anthology
 Front Line, fictional Marvel Comics newspaper that eventually replaced the Daily Bugle
 Civil War: Front Line, comic book series (2006–2007)

Film and television

Film
 Front Line (film), 1981 documentary
 The Front Line (2006 film), Irish thriller
 The Front Line (2009 film), Italian crime drama
 The Front Line (2011 film), Korean war drama

Television
 Frontline (Australian TV series), 1990s satirical series
 Frontline (American TV program), PBS documentary program launched in 1983
 The Front Line (British TV series), 1980s British sitcom
 The Frontline (Irish TV programme), 2009 topical debate programme
 BBC Scotland Investigates, current affairs program previously known as Frontline Scotland
 Frontline (The Bill), storyline in the British television series The Bill
 Frontline Pilipinas, Philippine television newscast broadcast by TV5

Games
 Front Line (video game), 1982 arcade game by Taito
 Frontlines: Fuel of War, 2008 console and computer game
 Medal of Honor: Frontline, 2002 console video game

Music
 Frontline Records, Christian music record label
 Front Line (record label), reggae subsidiary of Virgin Records
 Frontline (album), Redgum album (1984)

Bands
 Frontline (band),  New Zealand hip-hop group
 The Frontline,  California rap duo
 The Front Line, New Jersey punk band that eventually became U.S. Chaos
 The Front Line, 1960s band with a song on Love Is the Song We Sing: San Francisco Nuggets 1965–1970

Songs
 "Front Line" (song), by Stevie Wonder (1983)
 "Frontlines" (song), by Nonpoint (2010)
 "Frontlines", song by Soulfly in the Dark Ages (album)
 "Frontline", song by DJ Shaun Baker (2010)
 "Frontline", single by American singer Kelela, from the album Take Me Apart (2017)

Organizations
 Frontline Ltd., shipping company
 Frontline Systems Australia, IT company
 Frontline Foundation, Los Angeles nonprofit organization
 Frontline Club, British media correspondents' club
 Frontline Television News, co-operative of news cameramen
 Front Line (political party) in Greece
 Front Line Defenders, Irish-based human rights organisation
 Frontline States, organization of African nations
 Prima Linea (Front Line), Italian terrorist group (active 1976-1983)
 Primera Línea, 2019–21 loose association of Chilean protestors
 Frontline (ministry), young adult ministry based in Washington, D.C.
 The TNA Front Line,  professional wrestling stable
 Frontline, an imprint of American publisher Charisma Media

Other uses
 Front Line (CRI),  English-language Chinese news radio program
 Operation Front Line, U.S. national security operation
 Frontline (product) is used for the control of fleas and ticks in animals